Eufidonia discospilata, the sharp-lined powder moth, is a species of geometrid moth in the family Geometridae. It is found in North America.

The MONA or Hodges number for Eufidonia discospilata is 6639.

References

Further reading

External links

 

Melanolophiini
Articles created by Qbugbot
Moths described in 1862